is a Japanese cable television station which was founded during Japan's cable TV boom of late 1990s. It carries mostly domestic TV programs and has several popular anime titles on its program list.
Distributed by Sky PerfecTV and Dish Network (since April 2, 2018). Its channel number on Sky PerfecTV is currently 73.

External links
 

Mass media companies based in Tokyo
Japanese-language television stations
Television networks in Japan
Television channels and stations established in 1996
Television stations in Japan
Television in Tokyo